Geraldine C. Seydoux (born 1964 in Paris, France) is a Professor of Molecular Biology and Genetics (1995–present), 
the Huntington Sheldon Professor in Medical Discovery (2015–present), 
and the Vice Dean for Basic Research (2017–present) at Johns Hopkins University.
She is also a Howard Hughes Medical Institute Investigator. In 2002, Discover magazine recognized her  as one of the 50 most important women in science.

Education
Seydoux received a B.Sc. from the University of Maine, Orono in 1986. She graduated from Princeton University with a Ph.D. in 1991, and did post-doctoral training at the Carnegie Institution before  joining Johns Hopkins University in 1995.

Research
Seydoux's work has focused on the earliest stages of embryogenesis and how single-celled eggs develop into multicellular embryos. The Seydoux lab attempts to determine the process by which embryonic development and polarization are activated. Seydoux studies Caenorhabditis elegans to examine how embryos choose between soma and germline.
She was able to demonstrate that the synthesis of mRNA must be globally inhibited prior to the establishment of the germline.
Seydoux has also confirmed that proteins in a fertilizing sperm trigger the reorganization of structural proteins inside the ovum. This is an essential step towards the anterior-posterior polarization of the one celled embryo. Geraldine Seydoux's studies provide much insight into the creation of a fully formed multicellular organism from a single cell.

Awards
 2022, Gruber Prize in Genetics
 2019, Harvey Lecture
 2018, Kuggie Vallee Distinguished Lecturer
 2016,  elected to the National Academy of Sciences
 2013, elected to the American Academy of Arts and Sciences
 2001, Kirsch Investigator 
 2001, MacArthur Fellows Program
1997, Searle Scholar
 1996, Fellow, David and Lucile Packard Foundation

References

External links
 

Johns Hopkins University faculty
Howard Hughes Medical Investigators
Princeton University alumni
Living people
MacArthur Fellows
Members of the United States National Academy of Sciences
American geneticists
1964 births